Pesisir Selatan Regency (literally South Coast Regency) is a regency (kabupaten) of West Sumatra, Indonesia. It has an area of 6,049.33 km² and a population of 429,246 at the 2010 Census and 504,418 at the 2020 Census. The regency seat is at the town of Painan, in IV Jurai District.

Pesisir Selatan is located on the coast of West Sumatra and is bordered on the north by the city of Padang, in the east by the regencies of  Solok Regency, South Solok Regency and by Kerinci Regency (in the province of Jambi) and in the south by the regency of Muko-Muko (Bengkulu province).

Pesisir Selatan is known for its traditional music, the Rabab Pesisir. The music includes the playing of a rebab (a stringed instrument), accompanied by one or more musicians singing.

Administrative districts 
As at 2010 South Pesisir Regency consisted of twelve districts (kecamatan), but subsequently three additional districts have been created in the south by the splitting of each of the three existing districts in that sector. All these are tabulated below (listed from south to north, and grouped for convenience into three non-administrative sectors) with their areas and populations at the 2010 Census, and the 2020 Census. The table also includes the locations of the district administrative centres, the number of administrative villages (rural desa and urban kelurahan) in each district, and its postal codes.

Notes: (a) The former Lunang Silaut district had a population of 30,450 at the 2010 Census prior to its division into separate Lunang and Silaut districts. (b) The Basa Ampek Balai Tapan district had a population of 25,742 at the 2010 Census prior to the splitting off of a separate Ranah Ampek Hulu Tapan district.(c) The Pancung Soal district had a population of 37,002 at the 2010 Census prior to the splitting off of a separate Aipura district.(d) including two small offshore islands. (e) including five small offshore islands. (f) including one small offshore island. (g) including nine small offshore islands, the largest being Pulau Aua Gadang (69 ha). (h) including seven small offshore islands, the largest being Pulau Babi (96 ha). (j) including 23 small offshore islands, the largest being Pulau Cubadak (705 ha) and Pulau Marak (256 ha).

Siamang rehabilitation
Marak Island is 7.37 kilometres from Nagari Sungai Pinang land which 500 hectares area has used as Siamang (Symphalangus syndactylus) and Owa ungko (Hylobates agilis) rehabilitation center complete with quarantine, medical, social and rehabilitation cages since 2003. The plan is to release some Siamang which have could use upper room with sufficient activities, not depend on human anymore and match with his/her spouse to Bukit Tiga Puluh National Park. The island is now home for 30 butterfly species and 50 kinds of birds, and is suitable for a conservation area.

See also 
 Linggo Mountain
 Surantih

References

External links 

 

Regencies of West Sumatra